Advertising has been taught around the world for over 100 years. Originating at New York University with the course "Advertising", the subject is now offered through certificate, bachelors, masters, and doctorate programs in over 150 academic institutions. 

Along with advertising's role in higher education, professional advertising associations such as American Advertising Federation, American Association of Advertising Agencies (AAAA) provide a variety of educational programs to students and working professionals. Academic and research based organizations, such as the American Academy of and the Advertising Education Foundation work to research advertising, its functions and its future, as well as provide a variety of educational resources to students. 

An emerging platform for advertising education is the student-run advertising agency, an education-based marketing partnership between a for-profit company and a student group or a classroom. This method of teaching advertising fuses academic theories with practical applications.

References

Advertising